Coryneum is a fungus genus.

Species 

 Coryneum acaciae
 Coryneum aesculinum
 Coryneum affine
 Coryneum ambiguum
 Coryneum anhaltinum
 Coryneum arbuticola
 Coryneum artemisiae
 Coryneum berkeleyi
 Coryneum betulinum
 Coryneum bicorne
 Coryneum biseptatum
 Coryneum calophylli
 Coryneum calosporum
 Coryneum camelliae
 Coryneum camerunense
 Coryneum canadense
 Coryneum carbonaceum
 Coryneum carpinicola
 Coryneum castaneae
 Coryneum castaneicola
 Coryneum cesatii
 Coryneum clusiae
 Coryneum cocois
 Coryneum comari
 Coryneum compactum
 Coryneum concolor
 Coryneum confluens
 Coryneum confusum
 Coryneum corni-asperifoliae
 Coryneum crataegicola
 Coryneum cupulatum
 Coryneum cydoniae
 Coryneum decipiens
 Coryneum disciforme
 Coryneum discolor
 Coryneum dubium
 Coryneum effusum
 Coryneum eleagni
 Coryneum elevatum
 Coryneum ellipticum
 Coryneum ephedrae
 Coryneum epilobii
 Coryneum epiphyllum
 Coryneum eriobotryae
 Coryneum eucalypti
 Coryneum eurotiae
 Coryneum eximium
 Coryneum fagineum
 Coryneum feijoae
 Coryneum foliicola
 Coryneum foliorum
 Coryneum fusarioides
 Coryneum glochidiicola
 Coryneum gregoryi
 Coryneum gummiparum
 Coryneum heterosporum
 Coryneum impressum
 Coryneum indicum
 Coryneum insuetum
 Coryneum irregulare
 Coryneum japonicum
 Coryneum juniperi
 Coryneum kunzei
 Coryneum longistipitatum
 Coryneum lycii
 Coryneum macrosporum
 Coryneum maculicola
 Coryneum marginatum
 Coryneum megaspermum
 Coryneum menioci
 Coryneum microstictoides
 Coryneum microstictum
 Coryneum modonium
 Coryneum mucronatum
 Coryneum myristicae
 Coryneum naucosum
 Coryneum neesii
 Coryneum negundinis
 Coryneum nigrellum
 Coryneum notarisianum
 Coryneum obscurum
 Coryneum opacum
 Coryneum papilliferum
 Coryneum paraphysatum
 Coryneum pedunculatum
 Coryneum perniciosum
 Coryneum pinicola
 Coryneum pirinum
 Coryneum populi
 Coryneum populicola
 Coryneum prunorum
 Coryneum psidii
 Coryneum pulchrum
 Coryneum pustulatum
 Coryneum pyricola
 Coryneum pyrinum
 Coryneum quercinum
 Coryneum rhododendri
 Coryneum rhoinum
 Coryneum rhois
 Coryneum ribicola
 Coryneum romanum
 Coryneum rosae
 Coryneum rosicola
 Coryneum rostratum
 Coryneum rubi
 Coryneum ruborum

References

External links 
 Index Fungorum
 USDA ARS Fungal Database

Diaporthales
Sordariomycetes genera